abbreviated , is a private school for girls located in Tokyo, Japan.

Joshibi especially emphasizes fine arts and design studies. Joshibi graduates are actively involved in various field in and out of Japan, as artists, designers, and creative artists.

History 
Joshibi High School of Art and Design was established in 1915 as an affiliated school with Joshibi University of Art and Design. Bunzo Fujita (former Professor of Tokyo University of the Arts) was appointed to the first school principal. Joshibi High School of Art and Design was renamed as "Sato Girls' High School" in 1916 due to financial subsidies by Sato's family, the school name backed to the original name of "Joshibi High School of Art and Design" in 1951.

The school was founded at Hongō-ku (currently Bunkyō, Tokyo), later moved to Wada, Suginami in 1945 due to fire caused by Bombing of Tokyo. Joshibi High School building was completed newly built with three-story high and second basement floor structure in January 2010.

Johshibi High School of Art and Design celebrated its centennial anniversary in 2015. The 100th anniversary art exhibition was organized at the Ueno Royal Museum between May 17 and 24, 2015.

School life 
Joshibi students will study fine arts and design throughout the years, students highly study and improve their skills in sketching, painting, Graphic design, Spatial design, Computer graphics, sculpture, printing, pottery, and art history.

There are variety of school events organized throughout the years, include art exhibitions, painting Competitions, Public art/design competitions, painting trips, school trip, and athletic day.

Notable alumnae 
 Nagi Noda (Creator, Art Director)
 Yoshiko Mita (Actress)
 Jitsuko Yoshimura (Actress)
 Kaori Momoi (Actress)
 Narumi Yasuda (Actress)
 Mariko Kawana (Author, AV idol)
 Umeka Shōji (Voice Actress)
 Naoko Kume (Swimmer)

External links 
 Joshibi High School of Art and Design

Educational institutions established in 1915
Private schools in Japan
Junior high schools in Japan
High schools in Tokyo
Girls' schools in Japan
1915 establishments in Japan
Arts organizations established in 1915